"Lampshades on Fire" is a song by American alternative rock band Modest Mouse. It is the lead single from their sixth studio album Strangers to Ourselves, released on December 15, 2014.  This song as well as the entire Strangers to Ourselves album was mixed by Joe Zook.

Charts

Weekly charts

Year-end charts

References

Modest Mouse songs
2014 songs
2014 singles
Epic Records singles
Songs written by Jim Fairchild
Songs written by Isaac Brock (musician)
Songs written by Jeremiah Green
Songs written by Eric Judy
Songs written by Tom Peloso